Sébastien Minard (born 12 June 1982) is a French former professional road bicycle racer, who rode professionally between 2005 and 2016 for the ,  and  teams. His sporting career began with SV Senlis.

Major results

2002
 6th Grand Prix de la ville de Nogent-sur-Oise
2004
 1st Stage 1 Bidasoa Itzulia
 2nd La Roue Tourangelle
 2nd Grand Prix de Waregem
 2nd Grand Prix de la ville de Nogent-sur-Oise
 3rd Paris–Troyes
 3rd Paris–Tours Espoirs
 10th Paris–Roubaix Espoirs
2005
 1st Stage 10 Tour de l'Avenir
 7th Boucle de l'Artois
2006
 8th Paris–Bourges
2007
 5th Overall Étoile de Bessèges
 7th Overall Tour de Picardie
2009
 4th Tour du Finistère
 5th Overall Étoile de Bessèges
2010
 1st Paris–Camembert
 5th Polynormande
 6th Route Adélie
2012
 10th Paris–Camembert
2013
 4th Overall Tour de Picardie
2014
 8th Paris–Camembert
2016
 10th Tro-Bro Léon

Grand Tour general classification results timeline

References

External links 

 
Profile at Cofidis official website 

French male cyclists
1982 births
Living people
People from Senlis
Sportspeople from Oise
Cyclists from Hauts-de-France